Garrett Dutton (born October 3, 1972), better known as G. Love, is an American singer, rapper and musician best known as the frontman for the band G. Love & Special Sauce.

Biography 
Dutton, the son of a banking lawyer, was born in the Society Hill neighborhood of Philadelphia, and began playing guitar at age eight. He wrote his first song by the time he was in the ninth grade and began playing harmonica in a wire rack. Dutton credits Bob Dylan and John Hammond Jr., as well as the then-contemporary "old school" hip-hop sounds of Run-DMC, the Beastie Boys, and Philadelphia's own Schoolly D, as influences.

Dutton, who attended high school at the private Germantown Friends School, began playing solo on the streets of Philadelphia. After one year at Skidmore College, Dutton dropped out and relocated to Boston, working as a fundraiser for Peace Action and playing wherever and whenever he could.

Shortly after moving to Boston, Garrett met local producer Tom DeMille (later nicknamed T-Time by Garrett because of Tom's dual love for music and golf). Tom had hung a flyer at local music store 'Daddy's Junky Music' speaking of his desire to combine blues influences (like Muddy Waters, Howling Wolf, Little Walter, etc.) with modern music to create a new sound, which of course is exactly what Garrett was doing. Initially Garrett was focussed on recording early versions of songs like Yea It's That Easy and This Ain't living which combined street influences with classic blues instrumentation. Early renditions were typically Dobro guitar over a classic early 1990s HipHop beat and backed by synth bass and keys played by T-Time. In 1992, Garrett and T-Time both realized that neither of them was particularly good at programming good drum tracks and Garrett began looking for help in that area.

One of his few indoor gigs at this time was a Boston bar called The Tam O'Shanter (a Boston institution which was in business until 2018), where he met drummer Jeffrey "The Houseman" Clemens in January 1993. Dutton and Clemens began working as a duo, they were joined a few months later by bassist Jim "Jimi Jazz" Prescott and became the house band on Mondays at The Plough and Stars in Cambridge, Massachusetts.

In 1993, T-Time flew to New York to meet with an LA producer with connections to Michael Jackson (arranged through a family friend). T-Time shared some studio and live recordings of Garrett, who had just started going by the moniker G. Love. Later in 93 G. Love and Special Sauce (as the trio was now called) signed a record deal and released their first album in 1994.

G. Love featured Jack Johnson on his 1999 album Philadelphonic playing an early version of Jack Johnson's "Rodeo Clowns" when Jack was an unknown artist. Jack later featured the song on his 2003 album On and On. G. Love met Johnson through a mutual surf buddy who said, "Hey man, there's this kid you got to meet. He's a big fan and he's got this song called rodeo clowns and I think it's really great and I really think you should hear it." After that G Love saw Johnson's effortless style and potential and invited him into the studio to record the now-famous "Rodeo Clowns".

Garrett dated Tristan Prettyman and wrote the song "Beautiful" with her while they were dating.

Known for his live shows, he is often seen touring with Jack Johnson and Citizen Cope. As a producer, Johnson signed G. Love to his record label Brushfire Records. He has made appearances on the records of artists such as Slightly Stoopid and Donavon Frankenreiter, and has toured with Dave Matthews. 

In 2009, he collaborated with Zap Mama on their album ReCreation, singing on the single "Drifting".

In 2010, G. Love joined forces with The Avett Brothers who produced and are featured on his album "Fixin' to Die". The album was released under the Brushfire label on February 22, 2011.

Discography

Studio albums – solo 
The Hustle (Brushfire Records – 2004)
Lemonade (Brushfire Records – 2006)
Fixin' To Die (Brushfire Records – 2011)

Studio albums – with Special Sauce 
G. Love and Special Sauce (Epic – 1994)
Coast to Coast Motel (Epic – 1995)
Yeah, It's That Easy (Epic – 1997)
Philadelphonic (550 Music – 1999)
Electric Mile (550 Music – 2001)
Superhero Brother (Brushfire Records – 2008)
Sugar (Brushfire Records – April 22, 2014)
Love Saves The Day (Brushfire Records – October 30, 2015)
The Juice (2020)
Philadelphia Mississippi (Philadelphonic Records - June 26, 2022)

Bootlegs, demos or outtake albums 
Back in the Day (1993) [with Special Sauce]
G. Love In the King's Court (Fishtown Records – 1998; available online or at live shows, also Chicken Platters Records -1996 CP002) [as King's Court]
Oh Yeah (Philadelphonic Records – 1998) [Solo]
Has Gone Country (1998) [Solo]
Rappin' Blues EP (1999) [with Special Sauce]
Front Porch Loungin''' (2000) [with Special Sauce]Long Way Down (Philadelphonic Records – 2009 Australia & New Zealand only release) [with Special Sauce]

 Compilation albums Best Of (Sony – 2002) [with Special Sauce]Playlist: The Very Best of G. Love & Special Sauce (The Okeh Years)'' (Epic/Legacy – 2013) [with Special Sauce]

References

External links 
 G. Love and Special Sauce website
 
 G. Love's YouTube site
 "Hot Cookin'" artist commentary
 The band's Myspace page
 Always Refreshing: An Interview with G. Love
 G. Love interview with the Cornell Daily Sun
 Garrett sits down with Ira Haberman of The Sound Podcast for a feature interview
 [ Billboard.com Complete Discography of G. Love]
 

1972 births
Living people
Rappers from Philadelphia
Brushfire Records artists
21st-century American rappers
Germantown Friends School alumni
21st-century American male musicians
Republic Records artists
Thirty Tigers artists